WLBE (790 AM) is a radio station broadcasting a full service format with an emphasis on Timeless Classics. Licensed to Leesburg, Florida, United States, it serves the Lake County area and reaches into parts of nearby Marion County as well.  The station is currently owned by WLBE 790, Inc. As of April 7, 2021, they were on the air playing music, ID stated as Leesburg/Eustis. The NEW AM 790. The format is Timeless Classics. 

The station had previously gone silent due to financial difficulties on or about June 6, 2019. 

The station originally signed on in 1947 using the call letters WEUS, but changed to WLBE effective October 19, 1948.

References

External links
WLBE page on cflradio.net

LBE
Leesburg, Florida
1947 establishments in Florida
Radio stations established in 1947
Full service radio stations in the United States